Saddle River Day School is a coeducational, college-preparatory independent day school, located in Saddle River, in Bergen County, New Jersey, serving students in kindergarten through twelfth grade. Its student body is drawn from communities in Bergen, Essex, Morris and Passaic counties in New Jersey and Rockland County in New York.

The school was founded in 1957, by John C. Alford, and graduated its first senior class in 1960. Saddle River Day School is composed of three divisions: the Lower Division, the Middle Division and the Upper Division. In 1966 it received accreditation from the Middle States Association of Colleges and Schools, which expires in July 2027. The school is also accredited by the New Jersey Department of Education and is a member of the New Jersey Association of Independent Schools and the National Association of Independent Schools.

As of the 2017–18 school year, the school had an enrollment of 302 students (plus 4 in PreK) and 43.3 classroom teachers (on an FTE basis), for a student–teacher ratio of 7:1. The school's student body was 78.1% (236) White, 13.9% (42) Asian, 3.6% (11) Black, 3.6% (11) Hispanic and 0.7% (2) two or more races.

Curriculum
The Lower School offers foreign language instruction starting in Kindergarten, which continues as a requirement through 12th grade. The Upper School offers Advanced Placement exams in the following areas: English, United States History, European History, French Literature and/or Language, Latin, Spanish Literature and/or Language, Calculus AB and BC, Biology, Physics, and Chemistry.

Saddle River Day School also offers anyone in the 9th-12th grades participation in the yearly French Exchange Program. This program includes a two-week homestay in alternate years in Dijon, France.

Athletics
The Saddle River Day School Rebels participate in the North Jersey Interscholastic Conference, which is comprised of small-enrollment schools in Bergen, Hudson, Morris and Passaic counties, and was created following a reorganization of sports leagues in Northern New Jersey by the New Jersey State Interscholastic Athletic Association (NJSIAA). Previously, the school was a member of the all-private Patriot Conference, but after a decision by the NJSIAA in February 2008, both Hawthorne Christian Academy and Saddle River Day School joined the Olympic Division of the Bergen County Scholastic League (BCSL) later that year, and remained in the conference until it was disbanded as part of the NJSIAA's 2010 realignment. The BCSL was disbanded as a part of a wide-ranging realignment of high school sports in northern New Jersey, and Saddle River Day moved to the new NJIC in the fall of 2010. With 133 students in grades 10-12, the school was classified by the NJSIAA for the 2019–20 school year as Non-Public B for most athletic competition purposes, which included schools with an enrollment of 37 to 366 students in that grade range (equivalent to Group II for public schools).

The girls basketball team won the Non-Public Group B state title in 2018 (defeating Rutgers Preparatory School in the tournament final) and 2019 (vs. Trenton Catholic Academy), and was declared as the Non-Public North B sectional champion in 2020 after finals were cancelled due to COVID-19. The team won their first title with a 73-49 win against Rutgers Prep in the finals of the Non-Public B tournament final. The 2019 team repeated as winner of the Non-Public B title against Trenton Catholic by a score of 79-67 in the title game. The teams advanced to the Tournament of Champions both seasons. In 2018, the team was the fifth seed, winning the quarterfinals by 92-63 against fourth-seeded University High School before losing to number-one seed Manasquan High School 80-67 in the semifinal game played at the RWJBarnabas Health Arena to finish at 24-7 for the season. The 2019 team was the second seed and won the semifinal round by a score of 76-63 against number-three seed Manchester Township High School before losing in the finals to top seed Franklin High School by a score of 65-57 and finishing the season at 28-3.

Notable alumni
 Jeremy Glick (1970–2001), a passenger on Flight 93 on September 11, 2001.
 Aline Brosh McKenna (born 1967), screenwriter for 27 Dresses and The Devil Wears Prada
 Robert Kissel
 Jennifer Moore (1988–2006), high school student who was murdered in New York City.
 Danielle Pinnock (born 1988), actress, comedian and writer.

References

External links 
Official school website
 Data for Saddle River Day School, National Center for Education Statistics

1957 establishments in New Jersey
Educational institutions established in 1957
New Jersey Association of Independent Schools
Preparatory schools in New Jersey
Private elementary schools in New Jersey
Private high schools in Bergen County, New Jersey
Private middle schools in New Jersey